The Lashkar al-Zil or Shadow Army (also known as Jaish al Usrah, or the Army of the Protective Shield) is a paramilitary organization linked to al-Qaeda and descended from the 055 Brigade.  According to Syed Saleem Shahzad, it "comprises the Pakistani Taliban, 313 Brigade, the Afghan Taliban, Hezb-e-Islami Afghanistan and former Iraqi Republican Guards".  Lashkar al-Zil has reportedly been led by Khalid Habib al Shami (killed October 2008), Abdullah Said al Libi (killed December 2009), and Ilyas Kashmiri (killed June 3, 2011).

The Lashkar al-Zil has been involved in attacks in Afghanistan's eastern and southern provinces. News reports have linked it to several specific attacks, including the Camp Chapman attack (December 30, 2009) and the Sudhnati suicide bombing (January 6, 2010).

References

Al-Qaeda activities
Terrorism in Afghanistan
Military units and formations of the War in Afghanistan (2001–2021)